San Martín is a town and municipality in the Colombian Department of Cesar.

References

External links
 Gobernacion del Cesar, San Martin

Municipalities of Cesar Department